Megan Connolly may refer to:

 Megan Connolly (actress) 
 Megan Connolly (footballer)

See also
Connolly (surname)